Mochida (written: 持田) is a Japanese surname. Notable people with the surname include:

, Japanese singer
Masanari Mochida (born 1972), Japanese slalom canoeist
, Japanese kendoka
, Japanese weightlifter
, Japanese judoka

See also
Mochida Pharmaceutical, a Japanese pharmaceutical company
Mochida Station, a railway station in  Gyōda, Saitama, Japan

Japanese-language surnames